Nexus was an Estonian pop band formed in 1999 which split up in 2005. It consisted of the singers Janne Saar, Merlyn Uusküla and Helen Randmäe. The first two albums had mostly an electronic up-tempo and general pop sound, though their last album had some rock influences. Their live band featured drummer Boriss Hrebtukov, bassist Viljar Norman and guitarist Kristjan Kaasik.

Discography 
 Nexus (1999)
 Nexiam (2001)
 Nexus 2 (2004)
 Nii head tüdrukud ei tee (2004)
 Best of Nexus (2005)

External links 
 Entry at Estmusic.com

Estonian pop music groups
Musical groups established in 2003
Musical groups disestablished in 2006